The discography of Frightened Rabbit consists of five studio albums, two EPs, two live albums, and ten singles. The band released its debut album, Sing the Greys, in 2006 on independent label Hits the Fan, before signing to Fat Cat Records in 2007. In 2008, the band released its second studio album, The Midnight Organ Fight, to critical acclaim and subsequently developed a large cult following. The band's third studio album, The Winter of Mixed Drinks, was released in 2010, with the band signing to Atlantic Records later that year. A new EP, State Hospital, was released in September 2012.

Albums

Studio albums

Live albums

Extended plays

Singles

Other charted songs

Notes

Music videos

References

Discographies of British artists